

Prehistoric extinctions 

Mammals
 Panthera spelaea
 Deinotherium
 Cave hyena
 Cave bear
 Neanderthal
 Homo heidelbergensis
 Woolly mammoth
 Woolly rhinoceros
 Straight-tusked elephant
 Barbary macaque
 Mammuthus rumanus
 Panthera leo
 European dhole
 European Ice Age leopard

Birds
 Archaeopteryx

Reptiles
 Zalmoxes
 Struthiosaurus transilvanicus
 Telmatosaurus
 Elopteryx
 Magyarosaurus
 Bradycneme draculae
 Balaur bondoc
 Heptasteornis
 Hatzegopteryx
 Rhabdodon

Recent extinctions (1500+) 
Mammals
 Saiga antelope
 Mediterranean monk seal
 Moose
 Aurochs
 Bobak marmot
 Mongolian wild ass
 Tarpan

Birds
 Bearded vulture
 Great bustard (return in the 21st century)
 Griffon vulture (as a breeder)
 Cinereous vulture (as a breeder)
 Rock partridge
 Egyptian vulture (as a breeder)
 Red kite (as a breeder)
 Black kite (as a breeder)

 Ray finned-fishes
 Techirghiol stickleback

Fauna of Romania
Romania,extinct
Romania